Willy Alexander Rivas Asin (born 4 June 1985) is a Peruvian footballer who plays as a right back.

Club career
Rivas made his Descentralizado league debut in the 2005 season playing for Universitario de Deportes.

On 10 June 2011 it was announced that Rivas would join Sporting Cristal on loan for the rest of the 2011 season.

References

External links
 
 
 
 

1985 births
Living people
People from Lima Region
Association football fullbacks
Peruvian footballers
Peru international footballers
U América F.C. footballers
Club Universitario de Deportes footballers
Sport Áncash footballers
Górnik Zabrze players
Juan Aurich footballers
Irapuato F.C. footballers
Sporting Cristal footballers
León de Huánuco footballers
FBC Melgar footballers
Peruvian Primera División players
Ekstraklasa players
Peruvian expatriate footballers
Peruvian expatriate sportspeople in Poland
Expatriate footballers in Poland
Peruvian expatriate sportspeople in Mexico
Expatriate footballers in Mexico